English singer and songwriter Paloma Faith has released five studio albums, 39 singles and 36 music videos. Faith made her debut in September 2009 with the studio album Do You Want the Truth or Something Beautiful?, which peaked at number nine in the United Kingdom and was later certified double-platinum. Its first two singles, "Stone Cold Sober" and "New York", both peaked within the top twenty in the United Kingdom. The album spawned three more original singles: "Do You Want the Truth or Something Beautiful?", "Upside Down" and "Smoke & Mirrors".

In 2012, Faith released her second album, Fall to Grace. It was preceded by the single, "Picking Up the Pieces", which charted at number seven in the UK, becoming the singer's first top-ten single. "30 Minute Love Affair", "Just Be", "Black & Blue" and "Never Tear Us Apart" were all released as additional singles, the latter of which, a cover of the original by INXS, became Faith's fourth single to chart in the top 20 in the UK.

Faith's third studio album A Perfect Contradiction was released in 2014. Lead single "Can't Rely on You" charted at number ten in the UK, while second single "Only Love Can Hurt Like This", reached number six, marking Faith's highest-charting single in the country. The single also reached the summit of the Australian Singles Chart. "Trouble with My Baby" and "Ready for the Good Life" were released as the final singles from the album, the latter of which being from the repackaged Outsiders' Edition. The album was later certified Faith's third double-platinum record. The singer was also the featured vocalist on Sigma's number one single "Changing" the same year, earning Faith her first chart topping single of her career.

Faith released her fourth studio album The Architect in 2017, following a short time away from the industry to have her first child. The album debuted at number one on the UK Albums Chart, marking it the first chart-topping album of her career. It includes "Crybaby" and a cover of Mama Cass Elliot's 1969 single "Make Your Own Kind of Music", which was promoted through a TV commercial with Škoda. The following year, Faith was featured on Sigala's single "Lullaby", which charted at number six in the UK and was certified Platinum.

Faith released her fifth album "Infinite Things" in 2020 and was certified silver.

Studio albums

Singles

As lead artist

As featured artist

Promotional singles

Charity singles

Music videos

Other appearances

Notes

References

External links
[ Discography of Paloma Faith] at AllMusic

Discographies of British artists